Mary Robertson Bassett was a late 19th and early 20th century illustrator of magazines and children's books.

Career 
Mary Robertson Bassett illustrated magazines such as Ladies' Home Journal, and children's books published by P. F. Volland Company, Baker & Taylor Company, Grosset & Dunlap, and other publishers.

Her illustrations are sold at auction.

Reception 
Reviewers noted that her work was "unusually attractive", "charming", "beautifully illustrated", and "not only skilfully made, but also show a most appreciate feeling for the contents of the book." School and Home Education wrote of her work in Fairy Operettas (1916), "The imagination of the reader is agreeably stimulated by the illustrations from the pens and brushes of Mary Robertson Bassett."

Selected works 
Wells, Carolyn, and Mary R. Bassett. Marjorie's New Friend. New York: Grosset & Dunlap, 1909. 
Freeman, Mary Eleanor Wilkins, and Mary R. Bassett. The Green Door. New York: Moffat, Yard and Company, 1910. 
Johnson, Clifton, and Mary R. Bassett. Little Folks' Book of Verse. New York: Baker & Taylor Co, 1911. 
Richards, Laura, and Mary Robertson Bassett. Fairy Operettas. Boston: Little, Brown, 1916. 
Croll, Pauline, and Mary R. Bassett. Just for You. Chicago: P.F. Volland Co, 1918. 
Johnson, Clifton, Mary R. Bassett and Will Hammell. Poems My Children Love Best of All. New York: Lloyd Adams Noble, 1918.

References 

19th-century American women artists
20th-century American women artists
American women illustrators
American children's book illustrators
American magazine illustrators